Fushë-Bulqizë is a village and a former municipality in the Dibër County, eastern Albania. At the 2015 local government reform, it became a subdivision of the municipality Bulqizë. The population at the 2011 census was 3,342.

References 

Former municipalities in Dibër County
Administrative units of Bulqizë
Villages in Dibër County